Lieksa is a town and municipality of Finland. It is located in the North Karelia region.

The municipality is unilingually Finnish.

The town of Lieksa was established in 1973 when the Market town of Lieksa and the Municipality of Pielisjärvi were consolidated.

Geography 
Neighbouring municipalities are Ilomantsi, Joensuu, Juuka, Kontiolahti, Kuhmo and Nurmes.

Populated places 
Populated places within Lieksa include:
 Mätäsvaara
 Vieki

Climate 

Lieksa has a subarctic climate (Köppen: Dfc) with more continental characteristics than most of Scandinavia, making it prone to extreme temperatures, especially in winter. Also, during the Heatwave of 2010, the temperature in Lieksa reached  degrees. In winter, the snow cover is usually around 60 cm deep.

Notable natives
 Marutei Tsurunen (tsurunen marutei), born Martti Turunen in 1940-04-30, the first European-born member of the Diet of Japan.
 Ilmari Juutilainen, the top flying ace of the Finnish Air Force.
 Jorma J. Rissanen, an information theorist.
 Heino Kaski, composer
 Heikki Turunen, author

See also
Lieksanjoki
Koli National Park
Koli, Finland
Kuhmo
Reboly

References

External links
 
 
 Town of Lieksa – Official site
 Pocket Facts
 Lieksa daily photo – Unofficial daily photo

 
Cities and towns in Finland
Populated places established in 1973
Populated lakeshore places in Finland